Gail Dianne Bowen  ( Bartholomew; born September 22, 1942) is a Canadian playwright, writer of mystery novels and educator.

Biography
Born in Toronto, Ontario, Bowen was educated at the University of Toronto, where she earned a Bachelor of Arts degree in 1964. She then studied at the University of Waterloo, where she received a master's degree in 1975, and the University of Saskatchewan. She subsequently taught English in Saskatchewan, and was associate professor of English at First Nations University of Canada before retiring from teaching. She currently lives in Regina, Saskatchewan.

Bowen's mystery novels feature Joanne Kilbourn, a widowed mother, political analyst and university professor who finds herself occasionally involved in criminal investigations in various parts of Saskatchewan. Many have been adapted as Canadian television movies by Shaftesbury Films.

Several of her plays have been produced, including Dancing in Poppies, an adaptation of Beauty and the Beast, The Tree and an adaptation of Peter Pan, all premiering at the Globe Theatre in Regina. Her radio play Dr. Dolittle was broadcast on CBC Radio in 2006. She wrote The World According to Charlie D., a radio play focusing on the radio talk show host from her Joanne Kilbourn mysteries, broadcast on CBC Radio in 2007. A follow-up episode about Charlie D. aired in August 2008 as part of the WorldPlay series, airing on public radio networks in six English-speaking countries. In 2010, the first of a series of mystery novellas about Charlie D. was published.

Bowen was selected as the writer-in-residence for the Regina Public Library from September 2013 to May 2014. She has previously served as writer in residence at the Toronto Reference Library (2009) and Calgary's Memorial Park Library (2010).

Bibliography

Novels
 1919: The Love Letters of George and Adelaide (1986) Western Producer Prairie Books
 Love You to Death (2010) Orca Book Publishers - Rapid Reads
 One Fine Day You're Gonna Die (2010) Orca Book Publishers - Rapid Reads
 The Shadow Killer (2011) Orca Book Publishers - Rapid Reads
 The Thirteenth Rose (2013) Orca Book Publishers - Rapid Reads

Joanne Kilbourn novels
 Deadly Appearances (1990) Douglas & McIntyre
 Murder at the Mendel (1991, published in the US as Love and murder) Douglas & McIntyre
 The Wandering Soul Murders (1992) Douglas & McIntyre
 A Colder Kind of Death (1994, winner of the Arthur Ellis Award) McClelland & Stewart
 A Killing Spring (1996) McClelland & Stewart
 Verdict in Blood (1998) McClelland & Stewart
 Burying Ariel (2000) McClelland & Stewart
 The Glass Coffin (2002) McClelland & Stewart
 The Last Good Day (2004) McClelland & Stewart
 The White Bear (2005) McClelland & Stewart
 The Endless Knot (2006) McClelland & Stewart
 The Brutal Heart (2008) McClelland & Stewart
The Nesting Dolls (2010) McClelland & Stewart
 Kaleidoscope (2012) McClelland & Stewart
 The Gifted (2013) McLelland & Stewart
 12 Rose Street (2015) McClelland & Stewart
 What's Left Behind (2016) McClelland & Stewart
 The Winner's Circle (2017) McClelland & Stewart
 A Darkness of the Heart (2018) McClelland & Stewart
 The Unlocking Season (2020) ECW Press
 An Image in the Lake (2021)

Plays
 Dancing in Poppies (1993)
 Beauty and the Beast (1993)
 The Tree (1994)
 Peter Pan (1998 adaptation) Canadian singer/songwriter Fred Penner portrayed Captain Hook in a 2000 production also with composer/actor Derek Aasland as Peter Pan.

See also
 List of University of Waterloo people

References

External links
 Gail Bowen

1942 births
Living people
Canadian mystery writers
Canadian women novelists
Canadian women dramatists and playwrights
University of Saskatchewan alumni
University of Toronto alumni
University of Waterloo alumni
Writers from Regina, Saskatchewan
Writers from Toronto
Women mystery writers
20th-century Canadian dramatists and playwrights
21st-century Canadian dramatists and playwrights
20th-century Canadian novelists
21st-century Canadian novelists
20th-century Canadian women writers
21st-century Canadian women writers
Canadian crime fiction writers